The 1947 SANFL Grand Final was an Australian rules football competition.   beat  75 to 45.

References 

SANFL Grand Finals
SANFL Grand Final, 1947